Castle Walk Footbridge spans the River Severn in Shrewsbury, England, and was the first prestressed concrete bridge in Shropshire.

The footbridge was completed in November 1951, and built using balanced cantilever construction, with two cantilever sections and a central suspended span. The total central span is 150 ft. It was designed by L.G. Mouchel and Partners and built by Taylor Woodrow.

It links the Castlefields area of the town to the northwest with the Cherry Orchard/Underdale part of town to the southeast.

See also 
Crossings of the River Severn

References
Cragg, R., Civil Engineering Heritage - Wales & West Central England, Thomas Telford Publishing, 1997, 

Bridges in Shrewsbury
Bridges completed in 1951
Bridges across the River Severn
Cantilever bridges
Pedestrian bridges in England